Fulrada is a genus of snout moths described by Carl Heinrich in 1956.

Species
 Fulrada carpasella (Schaus, 1923)
 Fulrada querna Dyar, 1914

References

Phycitinae
Taxa named by Carl Heinrich
Pyralidae genera